Phylloporus gajari is a species of the fungal family Boletaceae. It was first described as a new species in 2015 from Bangladesh. This fungus is putatively associated with Shorea robusta.

References

External links

gajari
Fungi described in 2015
Fungi of Bangladesh